The Paraguayan ambassador in Washington, D. C. is the official representative of the Government in Asunción to the Government of the United States.

List of representatives

References 

Ambassadors of Paraguay to the United States
United States
Paraguay